Muhammad Ibrahim (born 27 April 1981), better known as Baim Wong, is an Indonesian YouTuber and actor. He is of mixed ethnic Chinese and Sundanese descent.

Career 
Baim had his first role in a soap opera in 2001, but didn't become serious about acting until 2007. The first time he played in the soap opera Cinta Hilang Cinta Kembali. After that, he played many roles in soap operas.

Personal life 
Baim was born on 27 April 1981, in Jakarta, the youngest of five children of the couple, businessman Johnny Wong and Kartini Marta Atmadja.

He married Indonesian model Paula Verhoeven in 2018.

Filmography

Film

Soap operas

Television film

TV show

Web series

Music video appearances

References

External links
 Official Website
 Baim Wong on IMDb
 Baim Wong on YouTube

Living people
1981 births
Indonesian male actors
Indonesian male television actors
Indonesian YouTubers
Indonesian Muslims
Indonesian people of Chinese descent
Indonesian Cantonese people
Cantonese people